"One Life, Furnished in Early Poverty" is the second segment of the eleventh episode from the first season (1985–1986) of the television series The Twilight Zone. It is based on the short story "One Life, Furnished in Early Poverty", by Harlan Ellison. The story was first published in the anthology Orbit 8 in 1970. The story follows a man who returns to his hometown and develops a relationship with his childhood self.

Plot
Gus Rosenthal is a middle aged screenwriter who is dissatisfied with his life. A toy soldier of his breaks and he travels to his old house in Ohio to bury it. While Gus sits under a tree he is transported back to the 1940s, and he finds himself dressed in a suit appropriate to that era.

Gus follows his childhood self and saves him from bullies. They strike up a friendship and he tries to act like a go-between for young Gus and his father. He tells young Gus how he decided he would be successful and famous when he grew up so that he could show up everyone who bullied him, but in the process of besting them he lost sight of what he really enjoyed in life, and he helps young Gus become interested in cartooning instead.

Gus's dad Lou eventually confronts Gus and tells him the relationship he has with his son is inappropriate. Lou tries to explain that he cannot understand young Gus, and Gus tells him he only need to listen to his son and let him know that he loves him. Gus explains to Lou that he and his father did not have a good relationship and his father died early. Gus admits that he wanted to give young Gus a chance. Lou tells him that he is a good man and that he is happy he has been a part of their lives.

Gus tells his younger self that he has to go back to Los Angeles. He tries to explain that he cannot return as he is ill. Young Gus becomes angry and runs away, pronouncing that he will become successful and famous to get back at him. Gus recalls in a predestination paradox that it was his adult self he was trying to show up, not the bullies. Gus is returned to the present. Gus was glad to make peace with his father. Gus hails a cab to go to the airport, and recites the name on the taxi license as one of the old bullies. When the driver asks if he knew him, Gus replies "Not anymore".

Production
The teleplay was written by Alan Brennert based on the short story by Harlan Ellison. Ellison took much of the story from his own life, including burying toy soldiers in the yard.

References

External links
 

The Twilight Zone (1985 TV series season 1) episodes
Television episodes about time travel
1985 American television episodes
Adaptations of works by Harlan Ellison
Television shows based on short fiction

fr:Le Parcours de ma vie